Biolchev Peak is the rocky peak rising to 1066 m in eastern Bigla Ridge on Heros Peninsula, Foyn Coast on the Antarctic Peninsula.  It surmounts Beaglehole Glacier to the west.

The feature is named after Boyan Biolchev, participant in the Bulgarian Antarctic campaigns in 2000/01 and subsequent seasons, for his support for the Bulgarian Antarctic programme.

Location
British mapping in 1974.

Maps
 British Antarctic Territory: Graham Land.  Scale 1:250000 topographic map.  BAS 250 Series, Sheet SQ 19–20.  London, 1974.
 Antarctic Digital Database (ADD). Scale 1:250000 topographic map of Antarctica. Scientific Committee on Antarctic Research (SCAR). Since 1993, regularly upgraded and updated.

Notes

References
 Biolchev Peak. SCAR Composite Antarctic Gazetteer.
 Bulgarian Antarctic Gazetteer. Antarctic Place-names Commission. (details in Bulgarian, basic data in English)

External links
 Biolchev Peak. Copernix satellite image

Mountains of Graham Land
Foyn Coast
Bulgaria and the Antarctic